The Ayshcombe Baronetcy, of Lyford in the County of Berkshire, was a title in the Baronetage of England. It was created on 28 May 1696 for Oliver Ayshcombe. The title became extinct on his death in circa 1727.

Ayshcombe baronets, of Lyford (1696)
Sir Oliver Ayshcombe, 1st Baronet (died )

References

Extinct baronetcies in the Baronetage of England